Starye Tlyavli (İśke Teläwle) is a rural locality (a village) in Bazgiyevsky Selsoviet, Sharansky District, Bashkortostan, Russia. The population was 267 as of 2010. There are 3 streets.

Geography 
Starye Tlyavli is located 20 km southeast of Sharan (the district's administrative centre) by road. Kir-Tlyavli is the nearest rural locality.

References 

Rural localities in Sharansky District